Rolf Manke (21 December 1915 – 1 March 1944) was the commander of  which was responsible for the sinking of four Allied ships and one neutral ship.

Early life
Rolf Manke was born on 21 December 1915.

Career
Manke entered the Kriegsmarine in 1935 and was commissioned as Leutnant zur See in 1938. From September 1938 until August 1941 he served with the Luftwaffe. According to a sailor who served on U-358, Manke was disliked by the crew as they thought him overly strict. The last patrol of U-358 sailed from St. Nazaire on 14 February 1944. According to the same sailor, the boat came under sustained attack from depth charges on 29 February/1 March and was eventually forced to surface due to foul air, but was submerged again when it came under further attack.

Manke was awarded the Iron Cross 1st and 2nd class, the U-boat Front Clasp, the U-boat War Badge and the German Cross in Gold.

Death
Manke died on 1 March 1944 in the sinking of U-358.

References

Bibliography
 

1915 births
1944 deaths
Luftwaffe personnel of World War II
Recipients of the Gold German Cross
U-boat commanders (Kriegsmarine)
People lost at sea
Kriegsmarine personnel killed in World War II
Military personnel from Berlin
People from Lichterfelde (Berlin)